Joshua A. Miele (born 1969) is an American research scientist who specializes in accessible technology design. Since 2019, Miele has been Principal Accessibility Researcher at Amazon Lab126, a subsidiary of Amazon that works on hardware products. Before joining Amazon, Miele conducted research on tactile graphics and auditory displays at the Smith-Kettlewell Eye Research Institute in California for fifteen years. He has been blind since early childhood.

Miele's work at Smith-Kettlewell includes Tactile Map Automated Production (TMAP), a web application for generating tactile maps of streets printable with a braille embosser, and YouDescribe, a web platform for creating and listening to audio descriptions of YouTube videos. As part of his TMAP project, Miele worked with a San Francisco nonprofit organization to produce tactile maps of the Bay Area Rapid Transit for teachers and other consumers starting in 2014. He is a 2021 MacArthur Fellow.

Life and career

Early life 
Joshua A. Miele was born in New York in 1969, the son of Isabella and Jean Miele and one of three siblings. At the age of four, he was blinded in an acid attack outside of his home in Park Slope, Brooklyn, and he underwent surgeries for his burns and blindness through his childhood. He attended the Industrial Home for the Blind for kindergarten.

Miele recalls his mother wanted him to be "as active and engaged with the world as possible" growing up and encouraged him to feel art in museums. Electronics and model kits that his mother bought for his birthdays lacked accessible instructions, so he would attempt to build them through trial and error. His father worked as an architect. When Miele was six or seven years old, he would play with floor plans and layout tape in his father's office. After his parents separated in 1975, Miele's siblings spent much time alone with each other.

In the first grade he was mainstreamed into Public School 102, where he was taught by the same teacher, from the third grade through high school, who transcribed all of his learning materials into braille. Miele and his sister moved to Rockland County with their mother's new partner. His stepfather, a geophysicist, would become a strong influence. He observed that, in this new environment, "most kids were afraid of me because I was different, and, for the first time in my life, I had classmates who thought it was fun to mess with the blind kid". In high school, he took classes in chemistry and biology and applied to study physics at the University of California, Berkeley in 1987.

Education 
Before moving to California for university, Miele's only significant encounter with other blind people was at a camp for blind youth in Vermont. At Berkeley, he studied with other visually impaired students and described going through classes with "almost no negative experiences" with his professors. He spent time in a study center for blind students in the basement of Berkeley's Moffitt Library, nicknamed "The Cave", where he recalls gaining awareness of "design and assumptions" and seeing how design choices in the world were shaped by "ableist thought behind who's in control of the tools that we use, whether those tools are intersection controls or building entrances or computer technology." Initially desiring to be a rocket scientist, Miele took an internship at NASA. One semester prior to graduation, he paused his education to work at Berkeley Systems, then a start-up developing Macintosh computer software to be accessible to blind people; he was hired to perform software testing and technical support for their OutSpoken screen reader software and took on more responsibilities such as technical writing and marketing for the product.

Miele returned to university to finish his physics degree and completed a summer internship at the Smith-Kettlewell Eye Research Institute in San Francisco, where he designed and developed accessible technology for visually impaired people. When Berkeley Systems was sold in 1996, Miele debated whether he should start a company or pursue a PhD in policymaking. His mentor from Smith-Kettlewell, Bill Gerrey, recommended Miele work as a scientist and obtain a degree in experimental psychology instead. Miele then began a PhD in psychoacoustics at Berkeley. His studies focused on auditory motion perception—perception of the direction and speed in which sounds are traveling through hearing. Through his studies he worked with the numerical computation software package MATLAB to develop tools for reproducing graphical information created by MATLAB, such as bar charts, in auditory and tactile formats.

Career 
Miele returned to the Smith-Kettlewell Eye Research Institute under a predoctoral fellowship, and after earning his PhD in 2003, completed a postdoctoral fellowship which ultimately led to a full-time position as a scientist. He acted as a principal investigator on some of the organization's projects and was associate director of research and development from 2007 to 2019. Using funding from the U.S. Office of Special Education Programs, Smith-Kettlewell opened its Video Description Research and Development Center (VDRDC) in 2011, with Miele as its director. From 2011 to 2015, Miele served as president of the board of the LightHouse for the Blind and Visually Impaired, a nonprofit organization based in San Francisco.

Miele left Smith-Kettlewell at the beginning of 2019, after working for the organization for more than fifteen years, and joined Amazon Lab126 as Principal Accessibility Researcher. In this position he has developed the usability of Amazon's website and devices for visually impaired people  he worked on braille and tactile interfaces for Amazon devices such as screen readers, tablets, and microwave ovens; the "Show and Tell" feature for Amazon Alexa, which identifies items the user holds up to the device; and audio descriptions for the streaming service Amazon Prime Video.

In 2021, Miele was awarded a MacArthur Fellowship "for his inventions giving blind and visually impaired people access to everyday technology"; the award citation highlighted his Tactile Map Automated Production, WearaBraille, and YouDescribe projects. He explained at a 2022 conference that the prize would be used to found a nonprofit organization, named the Center for Accessibility and Open Source, that would fund open-source projects for people with disabilities.

Personal life 
Miele lives in Berkeley, California with his wife and two children. He has two siblings. His older sister, Julia Miele Rodas, is a writer and professor at Bronx Community College, and his brother Jean Miele is a photographer. He plays the bass for services at a Jewish spiritual community in Berkeley.

Until 2013, when The New York Times published a profile of Miele's early life and career, he was hesitant to have his story published and let the day he was attacked as a child to "dominate his life", rather than be recognized for his work.

Research

Tactile graphics 

In 2003, while working at the Smith-Kettlewell Eye Research Institute, Miele began developing the Tactile Map Automated Production (TMAP) Project, a web application capable of producing tactile maps of streets suitable for printing with a braille embosser. Miele later worked with the LightHouse for the Blind and Visually Impaired to create tactile maps of the Bay Area Rapid Transit (BART). In developing a concept, Miele adapted a Livescribe digital pen to read off relevant information when the user taps a certain part of a tactile map, like which buses come through each bus stop. The LightHouse implemented Miele's concept through a four-year process which involved software design and testing, surveying transportation services, and building the maps. Distribution of the maps for use by teachers and other consumers began in 2014.

Maps produced with TMAP were featured in a 2018 exhibition at Cooper Hewitt, Smithsonian Design Museum. In 2018, the National Federation of the Blind presented LightHouse with its Dr. Jacob Bolotin Award for the development of TMAP.

Audio description 

A major project of the Video Description Research and Development Center (VDRDC) was the development a web platform, named YouDescribe, where volunteers can watch YouTube videos and record accompanying audio descriptions; users can then watch the videos using the crowdsourced audio descriptions. In order to gauge the popularity of audio description and obtain feedback through focus groups, Miele and his research group attended meetings of the National Federation of the Blind and the American Council of the Blind in 2012.

The website was launched in 2014. That year, Miele began hosting the annual Describeathon, a one-day event held at Smith-Kettlewell during which people recorded audio descriptions. The same year the Federal Communications Commission (FCC) awarded Miele the FCC Chair's Award for Advancement in Accessibility. Berkeley professor Georgina Kleege, writing on the history of audio description and its current state in 2016, discussed YouDescribe's merits and potential pitfalls and her students' experiences with the service. According to Smith-Kettlewell, by May 2022, the service was set to have nearly 5,000 video descriptions at the end of the year.

Other projects 
An early project at Smith-Kettlewell is WearaBraille, gloves that allow interaction with a smartphone by tapping braille on a hard surface. The WearaBraille functions wirelessly and can be used to send text messages, open applications, and answer phone calls. Miele also developed a basic iPhone application for blind wayfinding named overTHERE and in 2015 founded the Blind Arduino Project, a local group of blind students and hobbyists involved with the maker movement focused on designing their own technological devices.

Selected publications 
, Miele is listed as a co-author of at least seven journal publications:

References

External links 
 

1969 births
21st-century American inventors
Living people
American blind people
MacArthur Fellows
Blind academics
Scientists with disabilities
University of California, Berkeley alumni
Smith-Kettlewell Eye Research Institute people
Amazon (company) people
Acid attack victims